Joseph Maria Kumar Irudayaraj (born 1961) is an American engineer and chemist; he is a professor of bioengineering at University of Illinois at Urbana Champaign.  He is active in the field of bionanotechnology, molecular sensing and drug discovery core.

Awards 
 College of Engineering Research Excellence Award, Purdue University (2015)

References

Web-sources 
 
 

1961 births
Living people
21st-century American chemists
21st-century American engineers
Purdue University faculty